Amyda is a genus of softshell turtles in the family Trionychidae. 
It contains two extant species:
 Amyda cartilaginea - Asiatic softshell turtle 
 Amyda ornata - Southeast Asian softshell turtle

Both species were formerly considered subspecies of a single species, Amyda cartilaginea, but phylogenetic evidence supports both being distinct from one another. An undescribed species is also known from Borneo.

The fossil taxon 'Amyda' gregaria from the Eocene of Inner Mongolia has been tentatively placed in the genus Trionyx.

References

 
Turtle genera
Taxa named by Étienne Geoffroy Saint-Hilaire
Taxonomy articles created by Polbot